Moth Smoke is the debut novel by British Pakistani novelist Mohsin Hamid, published in 2000. It tells the story of Darashikoh Shezad, a banker in Lahore, Pakistan, who loses his job, falls in love with his best friend's wife, and plunges into a life of drugs and crime. It uses the historical trial of the liberal Mughal prince Dara Shikoh by his brother Aurangzeb as an allegory for the state of Pakistan at the time of the 1998 nuclear tests.

Synopsis
Darashikoh, or Daru as he is referred to, is a mid-level banker with a short fuse. His aggression had served him well as a college-boxer but an out-of-character outburst gets him fired. The loss of income brings to the fore a widening gap between him and his classmates, and Daru exposes his bitterness to the wealthy in his commentary. This contrast in income, though present through their years at school becomes evident to Daru only now as he comes to realise that money and wealth mean more than his personal traits can offer.

He is content to interact with his rich friends all the same, and finds comfort in the arms of Mumtaz – Daru's best friend's wife. Mumtaz falls for Daru too, but unlike Daru she is not an idealist. This mismatch of thought comes to the forefront soon after the long and rocky affair begins. While cuckolding his best friend, Daru is content to sell him drugs, which are socially acceptable among his friends. This life of duplicity leads to spiralling loss of control in his life.

Reception
Jhumpa Lahiri compared Hamid with F. Scott Fitzgerald for depicting the "slippery ties between the extremely wealthy and those who hover, and generally stumble, in money’s glare". In the New York Review of Books, Anita Desai noted: "One could not really continue to write, or read about, the slow seasonal changes, the rural backwaters, gossipy courtyards, and traditional families in a world taken over by gun-running, drug-trafficking, large-scale industrialism, commercial entrepreneurship, tourism, new money, nightclubs, boutiques... Where was the Huxley, the Orwell, the Scott Fitzgerald, or even the Tom Wolfe, Jay McInerney, or Brett Easton Ellis to record this new world? Mohsin Hamid's novel Moth Smoke, set in Lahore, is one of the first pictures we have of that world."

Awards and nominations
The novel won a Betty Trask Award, was a finalist for the PEN/Hemingway Award, and was a New York Times Notable Book of The Year.

Adaptations
The book was adapted into the 2002 Pakistani film, Daira (which translates to "circle" in Urdu). It was directed by Azfar Ali and stars Pakistani actor Shahzad Nawaz. A Hindi version was planned to be directed by Rahul Bose but could not materialise due to financial constraints.

References

External links 
General
 MothSmoke.com
 Interview on Moth Smoke from Harvard Law Bulletin
Reviews
 Review of Moth Smoke from Brothers Judd
 Review of Moth Smoke from The Asian Review of Books
 Reviews of Moth Smoke from Mohsin Hamid's website
 Review of Moth Smoke from the Village Voice
 Review of Moth Smoke from Fact Behind Fiction

2000 British novels
British novels adapted into films
Postcolonial novels
Novels by Mohsin Hamid
Novels set in Lahore
Pakistani novels
2000 debut novels